Lee Min-ji (born May 14, 1984), better known as stage name Yeon Min-ji, is a South Korean actress and singer. She is also active in Japanese entertainment under the mononym .

Filmography

Film

Television series

Music video

Discography

References

External links 
 
 
 

1984 births
Living people
South Korean television actresses
South Korean film actresses
South Korean web series actresses
Duksung Women's University alumni
21st-century South Korean singers
21st-century South Korean women singers